The Human-transcriptome DataBase for Alternative Splicing (H-DBAS) is a database of alternatively spliced human transcripts  based on H-Invitational.

See also
 Alternative splicing

References

External links
 https://web.archive.org/web/20110208034608/http://jbirc.jbic.or.jp/h-dbas/.

Biological databases
Gene expression
Spliceosome
RNA splicing